California Branch is a stream in Franklin and
Washington counties of the U.S. state of Missouri. It is a tributary of Indian Creek.

The stream headwaters arise in north-central Washington County approximately five miles west-northwest of Richwoods. The stream flows to the northwest for approximately five miles passing through the Little Indian Creek Conservation Area to its confluence 1.5 miles north of the Washington-Franklin county line.

California Branch was named after the state of California, the former home of an early settler.

See also
List of rivers of Missouri

References

Rivers of Franklin County, Missouri
Rivers of Washington County, Missouri
Rivers of Missouri